Reed Magazine is an annual literary journal published by San Jose State University. Two semesters of the Department of English and Comparative Literature's 133 class (comprising graduate and undergraduate students) solicit, edit, and promote the magazine for each year. It is the oldest literary journal based in California.

The journal prints art, poetry, and prose (fiction and nonfiction). It also sponsors the Edwin Markham Prize for Poetry, the John Steinbeck Short Story Award, the Gabriele Rico Challenge for Nonfiction, the Mary Blair Award for Art, and the Emerging Voices Contest for Santa Clara County, California high school students.

History 

Tracing its heritage to 1867 as The Acorn, the journal started as a mere pamphlet published by students of the California State Normal School, the precursor of San José State University. It was known as The Normal Pennant in 1898 (a reference to the California State Normal School), The Quill in the 1920s and El Portal in the 1930s.  In more than a century and a half of publication, the journal’s name evolved until the end of World War II. Then, in 1948, it adopted The Reed, which was later shortened to just Reed. At that time, the magazine was put together by SJSU's literary society, Pegasus, with help from the Associated Student Body.

Reed honors James Reed, a survivor of the infamous Donner Party and a prominent citizen of early California. James Reed made a fortune during the Gold Rush and strongly advocated that San José be named the capital of the new state. While he failed in that ambition, he did keep his promise to donate five hundred acres to the state. The current campus of San José State—the oldest public institution of higher education on the West Coast, and the founding institution of the California State University system—now occupies that land.

San José has changed a lot since James Reed first settled here. Prune and apricot orchards have given way to skyscrapers and the headquarters of major corporations. A tiny farming community has grown into the tenth largest US city and the nation’s unchallenged center of technological innovation. A small teaching college has evolved into a vibrant university with the most diverse student body in the nation, and an international reputation for excellence. 

Throughout these changes, Reed has remained a literary hub, publishing fiction, poetry, essays, profiles, and art from around the world. Reed is honored to feature the works of emerging authors alongside notable pieces by literary lions: nonfiction by Pulitzer Prize–winner William Finnegan, verse by U.S. Poet Laureate Robert Hass, fiction by PEN/Faulkner--winner T. C. Boyle, and National Book Award--winner Ursula K. Le Guin. In addition, Reed publishes original profiles of authors connected to the Golden State, examining their take on life and art.

Notable contributors 

Jacob M. Appel
T. C. Boyle 
Paul Calandrino
Stephen Dixon
Cory Doctorow
William Finnegan
Forrest Gander
Cristina Garcia
Robert Hass 
Brenda Hillman
Andrew Lam

Ursula K. Le Guin
Cathleen Miller
Nayomi Munaweera
Naomi Shihab Nye
Emmy Pérez
Mark Slouka
Michael Ernest Sweet
Arthur Sze
Rodrigo Toscano
Vendela Vida
Al Young

Joan Eyles Johnson
Arisa White
Kenny Fries 
Andrew Lam 
Mary Elizabeth Parker 
Kyle Killen 
Stephen Roger Powers 
Ed Sams 
Mark Wisniewski
Walter Griffin
Soma Mei Sheng Frazier

Judges 
S= Steinbeck

M= Markham

R= Rico

B= Blair

EV= Emerging Voices

*= Returning participant

Trivia 

 The transition of numbering copies of Reed Magazine from 70 to 150 instead in 2017 was because the literary journal wanted to celebrate its 150th anniversary.
The last copy to use the term volume was Reed 66 
After that, the magazine were labeled as "A literary Mosaic since..." for a couple years.

See also
List of literary magazines

References

External links
Reed Magazine
SJSU Department of English & Comparative Literature
San Jose State University

Literary magazines published in the United States
Annual magazines published in the United States
Magazines established in 1948
Magazines published in California
San Jose State University